The Chevrolet Corvette (C4) is the fourth generation of the Corvette sports car, produced by American automobile manufacturer Chevrolet from 1983 until 1996. The convertible returned, as did higher performance engines, exemplified by the  LT5 found in the ZR-1. With a completely new chassis, modern sleeker styling, and other improvements to the model, prices rose and sales declined. The last C4 was produced on June 20, 1996.

Overview

The C4 Corvette represented a clean break from the Zora Arkus-Duntov-designed C3, with a completely new chassis and sleeker, more modern but still evolutionary styling. It was the work of a team under chief Corvette designer Dave McLellan, who'd taken over from Duntov in 1975. In a departure from the fiberglass panels of its forebearers, the C4's rear bumpers and panels were made from molding plastics, a sheet molding compound. The C4 fastback coupé was the first general production Corvette to have a glass hatchback (the limited edition 1982 Collector Edition being the first Corvette equipped with this feature) for better storage access. The roof panel made from fiberglass or optionally from clear acrylic was removable. The Corvette C4 came standard with an electronic dashboard with a digital liquid crystal display instrument cluster. It displayed a combination of graphics for speed and RPM, fuel level, and used digital displays for other important engine functions. For the first time since 1957, the Corvette used single headlights instead of quad units, but they were still retractable.

Since emissions regulations were still changing and electronic engine management was in its infancy, engine power output was low compared to earlier generations. The primary design emphasis at launch was therefore focused on handling and braking, with an all-independent light-weight suspension and wheels and all new brakes with aluminum calipers. The front suspension saw the C3's coil springs replaced by a transverse fiberglass mono-leaf spring, which was only 1/3 of the weight of the coil springs while also introducing an anti-roll bar-like effect on the front. The price of the emphasis on handling was ride comfort, especially with the Z51 performance and handling package. Spring rates were sequentially softened for the 1985 model year. The C4 did not use separate body-on-frame construction like its predecessors. Instead, it used what GM termed a "uniframe", which consisted of a traditional perimeter frame, with the door posts, windshield frame, halo U-shaped frame overhead behind the seats and the rear portion of the floor pan integrated into one welded assembly. This was not a unibody assembly, as none of the exterior body panels were structural members. Due to a styling decision to use a targa top instead of T-tops, there was no structural member tying the windshield frame to the halo as on the C3. This required extremely tall side rails on the frame to maintain chassis rigidity, and as a result, the door sills were quite deep, with entry and exit likened by contemporary auto journals to a "fall in and climb out" experience. The targa top bolted into place, becoming a structural component, rather than simply latching on like T-tops. The emergency brake, located between the door sill and the drivers seat, was moved lower and toward the rear of the car in 1987 for easier entry and exit.

From the 1984 model year (available January 1984) through the 1988 model year, the Corvette was available with a Doug Nash "4+3" transmission - a 4-speed manual coupled to an automatic overdrive on the top three gears. This unusual transmission was a synergy that allowed the Corvette to keep a stout 4 speed, but add an overdrive. As technology progressed, it was replaced by a modern ZF 6-speed manual transmission. However, the C4's performance was hampered by its L98  engine until 1992, when the second-generation Chevy small block, the  LT1, was introduced, markedly improving the C4's performance. 1996 was a high point of small block engines development and the  LT4 was introduced in all six-speed manual transmission equipped cars. While the LT4 was available in any Corvette, it was highlighted in the 1996 Grand Sport package.

The 1986 Corvette saw the return of the convertible and was named as the Pace Car for the Indianapolis 500. 1986 also saw the introduction of the Pass Key I passive anti-theft system, wherein each key contained a special pellet that could be detected and identified by the car's computer system by detecting electrical resistance. Being early in the rollout of this new technology, there were only 15 different resistance values available. Once thieves discovered this weakness, it markedly reduced the value of this early system.

Only a total of 43 prototype and pre-production Corvettes were manufactured with a 1983 Vehicle Identification Number (VIN). None were made available to the public as official production vehicles. All were destroyed except one, VIN 1G1AY0783D5100023 (white with a medium blue interior), fitted with a  L83  V8 engine and a 4-speed automatic transmission. It was displayed above the factory entrance for years until it was restored and is now displayed in the National Corvette Museum in Bowling Green, Kentucky. The 1983 model delay was due to problems with parts supplier quality issues and production line changeover issues. GM decided to cancel the 1983 model year production and started the 1984 model year Corvettes early. Regular 1984 model year production began on January 3, 1983, and delivery to customers began in March 1983. The 1984 models were produced for 17 months.

ZR-1 (1990–1995)

General Motors acquired Group Lotus, a UK based engineering consultant and performance car manufacturing firm, during 1986. The Corvette division approached Lotus with the idea of developing the world's fastest production car, to be based on the C4 generation of the Corvette. With input from GM, Lotus designed a new engine to fit in place of the L98 V8 that was powering the standard C4. The result was what GM dubbed the LT5, an aluminum-block V8 with the same bore centers as the L98, but with four overhead camshafts and 32 valves. Lotus also designed a unique air management system for the engine to provide a wider power band by shutting off 8 of the 16 intake runners and fuel injectors when the engine was at part-throttle, while still giving the ZR-1 a power output of  when at wide open throttle.
In addition to the engine, Lotus helped GM design the ZR-1's (which in prototype version was called "King of the Hill")  The ZR-1 is fitted with Goodyear Eagle Gatorback tires having size of P315/ 35ZR-17 specially made for the car along with bigger ventilated disc brakes. Due to the heavier engine and body work along with wide tires, the ZR-1 is  heavier than the standard C4 Corvette. The ZR-1 came standard with the UJ6 Low-Tire-Pressure Warning System along with an ABS system manufactured by Bosch. The FX3 suspension system was engineered by Bilstein and was similar to the system used in the Porsche 959 albeit with modifications from the Lotus Formula 1 division. The system used a gas-over-oil shock absorber whose hollow center shaft came fitted with an adjustable orifice which controls the flow of oil in the shock absorber. The system allowed for six damping settings in each of the three driving modes namely Touring, Sport, and Performance and had 14 total steps. Servomotors coupled with a microprocessor governed the vehicle's speed and adjusted the suspension system accordingly.

The 5.7-litre DOHC 32-valve LT5 engine unique to the car had a central bore spacing of 4.40 inches. The distance was maintained by reducing the bore from 4.00 to 3.90 inches while the stroke was increased from 3.48 to 3.66 inches. The aluminum cylinder liners were Nikasil-coated and the engine block has a cast-aluminum oil sump. The crankcase has integral four- and six-bolt cast-iron main
bearing caps which secure the forged steel crankshaft into place. The four camshafts of the engine are driven by a roller chain and actuate hydraulic lifters that eliminate valve lash adjustment. The four-valve combustion chambers feature centrally-located spark plugs which act in combination with dished aluminum pistons enabling for a compression ratio of 11.0:1. The engine held 12 quarts of oil, 7 more than the L98 engine. The LT5 also came with a unique two valve induction system along with 16 tuned-length intake runners and a specially designed intake manifold using three throttle bodies. The small primary throttle body was for responsive low speed operation while the two large secondary throttle bodies enabled for full-power usage. The engine used direct-fire ignition: Four coils ignite two spark plugs simultaneously, upon receiving their cue from a crankshaft sensor acting in combination with the ECM. Spark advance and
retardation are electronically controlled by the ECM, which gets an additional information from a knock sensor. A distinctive cooling system incorporating a 15% larger radiator ensured that the operating temperature of the engine remained the same as the L98 despite the differences in construction and operation.

In order to transfer power efficiently to the rear wheels, a unique 6-speed manual transmission manufactured by ZF was installed with a code name of ML9. The transmission used Computer Aided Gear Selection (CAGS) which forced the driver to shift from first to fourth under low power urban driving conditions. The transmission has a tweaked ring and pinion ratio of 3.54:1 and a lower final drive ratio of 3.33:1.

Other exterior modifications include a hard coated acrylic roof panel, and seven additional exterior colors. The interior came standard with leather sports seats and a Delco/Bose sound system.

Tested performance figures by Road & Track magazine include a  acceleration time of 4.9 seconds, a quarter mile time of 13.4 seconds, braking distance of 132 ft from 60 mph and 233 ft from 80 mph along with skidpad acceleration of 0.94 g.

GM found that the engine required special assembly, and that neither the Corvette plant in Bowling Green, Kentucky, nor any of their normal production facilities could handle the workload, so Mercury Marine corporation of Stillwater, Oklahoma, was contracted to assemble the engines under their MerCruiser division, due to their experience in working with aluminum, and ship them to the Corvette factory in Bowling Green where the ZR-1s were being assembled. The engine assembly involved 95% drilling and boring completed at the Mercury Marine plant. The engine was largely assembled by hand and was tested on an engine stand before being sent to Chevrolet. Mercury Marine secured two LT5 V8 engines for itself. These engines were used in the ZR-1 owned by the company president and a custom made speedboat called the "Wette Vette".

The ZR-1 was introduced at the 1989 Geneva Motor Show and went on sale later that year and was available only as a fastback coupé bodystyle with a removable roof panel. It was distinguishable from other Corvette coupes by its wider tail section, 11-inch wide rear wheels and its new convex rear fascia with four square shaped taillights along with a special red ZR-1 badge in between.

In 1990, the 1991 ZR-1 and 1991 base model received updates to bodywork, interior, and wheels. The rear convex fascia and square taillights that set the 1990 ZR-1 apart from the base model found their way to all 1991 models, making the high-priced ZR-1 less distinguishable; however the ZR-1's center high mount stop lamp remained above the rear window while those on base Corvettes were integrated into the rear fascia. Further changes were made the following year in 1991, including extra ZR-1 badges on the fenders and the introduction of Acceleration Slip Regulation (ASR) or traction control. In addition, a new exhaust gas recirculation system improved emissions control. The model remained nearly unchanged into the 1995 model year, after which the ZR-1 was discontinued as the result of waning interest, development of the LS series engines, manufacturing cost and the forthcoming introduction of the C5 generation. A total of 6,939 ZR-1 models were manufactured over the six-year period. Not until the debut of the C5 based Z06 in 2001 would Chevrolet have another production Corvette capable of matching the ZR-1's performance.

Although the ZR-1 was extremely quick for its time (0- in 4.4 seconds, and onto over ), the huge performance of the LT5 engine was matched by its robustness. As evidence of this, a stock ZR-1 set seven international and world records at a test track in Fort Stockton, Texas, on March 1, 1990, verified by the FIA (Fédération Internationale de l'Automobile) for the group II, class 11 category: 
  at 
  at 
  at 
 12 Hours Endurance at 

These records were later broken by the Volkswagen W12, a one-off concept car that never went into production.

ZR-1 Active Suspension prototype (1990)

The Active Suspension prototype was based on the ZR-1, but it includes active hydraulic suspension found in GTP Corvette race car. It was developed as a prototype for a limited edition run in the 1990 model year.

25 active suspension vehicles were built at the Bowling Green Plant.

A prototype was sold in 2009 at the Barrett-Jackson Palm Beach auction for $60,000 (before buyer premium).

B2K Callaway Twin-Turbo
The B2K was a high performance alternative to the standard Corvette offered by Callaway Cars under license from Chevrolet from 1987 to 1991. It was available at Chevrolet dealers if the customer selected the "RPO B2K" option on the order specification sheet. Chevrolet approached Callaway to offer such an option after seeing the power output the tuning company was able to extract reliably from modified twin-turbocharged Alfa Romeo V6 engines. The car came with normal Chevrolet warranty as well as additional one year 12,000 mile warranty from Callaway Cars. The conversion cost an extra US$26,995 over the price of a base model Corvette. The conversion consisted of taking the engine out of the car and performing a thorough set of modifications along with installing two turbochargers. The result was the engine rated at a reportedly conservative . The car was classified as a standard Corvette by the EPA so it wasn't subject to additional registration requirements. Over 500 cars were subject to the conversion.

Special editions

Pace Car Convertible

A yellow convertible was the pace car for the 1986 Indianapolis 500 race. This marked the return of the convertible body style, absent from the Corvette lineup since 1975. All 7,315 1986 convertible Corvettes (all exterior colors) had "Indy 500 Pace Car" console identification.

35th Anniversary

The 1988 35th Anniversary edition, also known as the "Triple White Corvette" is a white Corvette fastback coupe with white wheels and white interior (including seats & steering wheel). It also features a removable black top and came equipped with everything, including its own unique emblems. The 35th Anniversary car is the 2nd Serialized Corvette in the production history of the C4 Corvette, with each car receiving an engraved number plaque on the console. 2,050 cars were built and a quoted 180 of these were manual transmission cars, making this a rare and collectible model.

40th Anniversary

The 1993 40th Anniversary package was available on all models. It included Ruby Red metallic paint and Ruby Red leather sport seats, along with Ruby Red Center Caps on the wheels, special trim and 40th anniversary side emblems. 6,749 were sold at an additional cost of US$1,455. All leather seats have the 40th emblem embroidered due to an error on the drawings sent to the seat supplier.

Brickyard 400 Festival/Parade Car
In 1994 twenty five (25) Corvette Convertibles were delivered to the Indianapolis Motor Speedway for use in the inaugural running of the Brickyard 400. The Corvettes were primarily used to introduce the 43 NASCAR drivers in a parade lap prior to the start of the race during driver introductions. There were thirteen Red and twelve Black convertibles used, and most carried two drivers on the lap, with their names displayed on the hoods. They also carried civil, NASCAR, and Manufacturer dignitaries on other parade laps, such as "the King" Richard Petty, Bobby Allison, and Mayor Goldsmith of Indianapolis. It is unknown how many of these cars still exist in "full dress" since many dealers just removed the graphics when they received the cars after the race.

Indy Pace Car

In 1995, a C4 convertible was again the pace car for the Indianapolis 500, and a special pace car edition was offered. 527 were built.

Grand Sport

Chevrolet released the Grand Sport (GS) version in 1995 to mark the end of production of the C4 Corvette. The Grand Sport moniker is a nod to the original Grand Sport model produced in 1963. A total of 1,000 GS Corvettes were produced, 810 coupes and 190 convertibles. The Grand Sport came only in Admiral Blue with a white stripe down the middle, 5-spoke black wheels, two red "hash marks" on the front driver's side wheel arch and special seat trim providing a distinctive look. The Grand Sport also has wider tires and the coupes were outfitted with small rear fender flares. The C4 Grand Sport also had a unique VIN compared with the standard C4.

Collector Edition
The 1996 Collector Edition was the last of the C4 Corvettes, just as the 1982 Collector Edition was the last of the C3s. It included Sebring Silver paint, silver 5-spoke alloy wheels, special emblems and seat trim. Of the 5,412 built, 4,031 were coupes and 1,381 were convertibles. It cost $1,250 more than the base model Corvette.

Production notes

Engines

Concept cars

Ramarro 

The Ramarro is a restyled version of the C4 Corvette built by Italian design house Gruppo Bertone. The concept was unveiled in 1984 at the Los Angeles Auto Show, going on to win Auto&Design's Car Design Award in 1985. It is named after the Italian word for "green lizard".

CERV III

In June 1985, Chevrolet Chief Engineer Don Runkle and Lotus' Tony Rudd discussed creating a new show car to show off their engineering expertise. It was first unveiled at the Detroit Auto Show in January 1986 as the Corvette Indy concept car.  By 1990, the project evolved into the CERV III (Corporate Engineering Research Vehicle III), which was a prototype closer to a production-ready vehicle. It was not approved for production due to its high cost.

ZR2
Also called the 'Big Doggie', the ZR2 is a concept model based on a C4 Corvette, but with a much larger  big block OHV V8 engine with multi-port fuel injection similar to the tuned port injection found on the 1985-1991 base model and a 6-speed manual transmission.

The vehicle was built in 1989 by Corvette Development Engineering as a development car to study the possibility of achieving the performance of the ZR-1 while reducing cost by utilizing a big block engine.

The prototype vehicle, orange with black interior, was sold in 2009 at the Barrett-Jackson Collector Car Auction for US$71,500.

Racing

Corvette GTP (IMSA)

As part of GM's initiative to promote the new C4 Corvette, the company funded a program in the IMSA GT Championship to run a GTP-class prototype under the Corvette name, mostly run by Hendrick Motorsports. Although the Corvette GTP actually shared very little with the production C4 Corvette, including the lack of a V8* engine in some races, it did use some styling cues. The project lasted until 1988 with mixed success.

* Note:
The final Corvette GTP built (HU8811.01), as raced by Peerless Racing, underwent extensive wind tunnel testing by GM, with many of the 'aero' developments (such as the short tail design) being used in later production C4s. The Peerless GTP Corvette also went back to the V8 small block engine from the turbocharged V6. This final GTP Corvette (Peerless) was driven by Hobbs, Baldwin, Villeneuve and Goodyear in IMSA before having the BBC based Eagle (10.2) engine installed to take to attempt to race at the Le Mans 24 Hours in 1990.

Le Mans

The C4 also made an appearance in international sports car endurance racing in a project orchestrated by former Corvette Cup driver Doug Rippie. The car, based on the ZR1 trim C4, competed in the popular GT1 class in 1995 at Le Mans and Sebring, where it momentarily led.

References

Further reading

External links

 C4 Vette Registry
 Callaway Twin-Turbo Corvette video

C4
Cars introduced in 1984
1990s cars
Cars discontinued in 1996
Front mid-engine, rear-wheel-drive vehicles